Chibougamau/Lac Caché Water Aerodrome, formerly , was located on Lac Caché,  south southwest of Chibougamau, Quebec, Canada. The aerodrome was owned and operated by Air Saguenay, who also run Lac Sébastien Water Aerodrome, Chutes-des-Passes/Lac Margane Water Aerodrome and Lac Pau (Caniapiscau) Water Aerodrome.

See also
Chibougamau (Hydro-Québec) Heliport
Chibougamau Heliport
Chibougamau/Chapais Airport

References

Registered aerodromes in Nord-du-Québec
Chibougamau
Defunct seaplane bases in Quebec